Narendra Singh Verma (born 10 January 1964) is an Indian politician and a member of the 17th Legislative Assembly in India. He represents the Mahmoodabad constituency of Uttar Pradesh and is a member of the Samajwadi Party political party.

Early life and  education
Narendra Singh Verma was born in Sitapur district. He attended  the University of Lucknow and attained postgraduate degree.

Political career
Narendra Singh Verma has been a MLA for six terms. He represented the Mahmoodabad, District Sitapur constituency and is a member of the Samajwadi Party political party.

See also

 Mahmoodabad (Assembly constituency)
 Sixteenth Legislative Assembly of Uttar Pradesh
 Uttar Pradesh Legislative Assembly

References

Posts held 

1964 births
Living people
People from Sitapur district
People from Uttar Pradesh
Samajwadi Party politicians
Uttar Pradesh MLAs 1991–1993
Uttar Pradesh MLAs 1993–1996
Uttar Pradesh MLAs 2002–2007
Uttar Pradesh MLAs 2007–2012
Uttar Pradesh MLAs 2012–2017
Uttar Pradesh MLAs 2017–2022
Bharatiya Janata Party politicians from Uttar Pradesh